The Beatles' Million Sellers is an EP by the Beatles, released on 6 December 1965. The EP was only issued in mono, with the catalogue number Parlophone GEP 8946. It was also released in New Zealand. The EP consists of songs that had sold over 1 million copies each as singles, the highest being She Loves You, which sold 1.89 million copies.

All four tracks had previously been number 1 hit singles in the UK chart. Apart from "Can't Buy Me Love", the songs had not appeared on any previous Beatles album. The EP effectively served as a catch-up for new listeners, as well as being the nearest thing to a greatest-hits album the group's homeland had seen up to this point. The band's first UK compilation album, A Collection of Beatles Oldies, would be released in December 1966.

Background
The Beatles' Million Sellers is the tenth EP released by the Beatles. The EP includes four songs, all released in 1963 and 1964. As of 2007, the combined worldwide sales of all four singles stood at over 27 million copies. These songs all rank in the top 30 UK Million-Selling Singles. The EP itself was number 1 for 4 weeks in early 1966.

Track listing
All songs written by Lennon–McCartney.

Side one
"She Loves You" – 2:19
"I Want to Hold Your Hand" – 2:24

Side two
"Can't Buy Me Love" – 2:15
"I Feel Fine" – 2:20

Personnel
According to Ian MacDonald:

The Beatles
John Lennonlead vocal, rhythm guitar, handclaps; lead & rhythm guitars 
Paul McCartneylead and harmony vocals, bass, handclaps
George Harrisonharmony vocal, lead guitar, handclaps; lead & rhythm guitars 
Ringo Starrdrums, handclaps

Production
George Martinproducer
Norman Smithengineer

References

Sources 

 
 

1965 EPs
Albums produced by George Martin
The Beatles EPs
Parlophone EPs